Paulson Pouchon Pierre (born July 7, 1993) is a Haitian footballer who plays for Dominican club Cibao FC as a defender.

Honours
 Cibao
CFU Club Championship (1): 2017

External links

1993 births
Living people
People from Saint-Marc
Haitian footballers
Association football fullbacks
Baltimore SC players
Liga Dominicana de Fútbol players
Cibao FC players
Haiti international footballers
Haitian expatriate footballers
Haitian expatriate sportspeople in the Dominican Republic
Expatriate footballers in the Dominican Republic